Ard is a surname of Scottish origin. It is an anglicized variant of the original Scottish surname Aird.

Origins and variants 
Ard is a habitational name from any of several places called Aird in Scotland, including a small hamlet near Hurlford in Ayrshire, a small village in the parish of Inch in the council area of Dumfries and Galloway, and the Aird, a district in the Vale of Beauly near Inverness. These place names are derived from the Gaelic àird(e), which means "height", or "promontory", or from "àrd" which means "high", suggesting that the first to use the surname hailed from a location of high elevation.

The surname Ard was first found in the historic county of Ayrshire (Gaelic: Siorrachd Inbhir Àir) in southwest Scotland, and the ancient Strathclyde-Briton people of the region, which today consists of the Council Areas of South, East, and North Ayrshire in the present-day region of Strathclyde, were the first to use the name. The family likely came from the village near Hurlford in East Ayrshire, which would suggest that that location is likely the name's actual area of origin.

Until the gradual standardization of English spelling in the last few centuries, English lacked any comprehensive system of spelling. Medieval Scottish names, particularly as they were Anglicized from the original Gaelic, historically displayed wide variations in recorded spellings as scribes of the era spelled words according to how they sounded rather than any set of rules. This means that a person's name was often spelled several different ways over a lifetime. As such, different variations of the Ard surname usually have the same origin.

People with the surname
 Alastair Aird, British royal courtier
 Catherine Aird, pseudonym of author Kinn Hamilton McIntosh
 Fraser Aird, Canadian footballer
 Holly Aird, British actress
 Jock Aird, Scotland and New Zealand international footballer
 John Aird (disambiguation)
 Kenny Aird, Scottish footballer (St Mirren, St Johnstone, Heart of Midlothian)
Lashrecse Aird (born 1986), American politician
 Michael Aird, Australian politician
 Peter Aird, Scottish footballer (Hibernian, East Fife)
 Robert B. Aird, American neurologist
 Ronnie Aird, English cricketer and cricket administrator
 Thomas Aird, Scottish poet

See also
 Aird (disambiguation)
 Airds

References

Scottish surnames
Surnames of British Isles origin